William J. "Bill" O'Brien (February 19, 1930 in Jacksonville, Florida – June 25, 2007) was a Minnesota Republican politician, who served as Minnesota State Auditor and a member of the Minnesota House of Representatives. O'Brien also unsuccessfully sought the office of Minnesota Secretary of State.

Born in Jacksonville, Florida, O'Brien moved to Minnesota in his youth. He graduated from St. Paul Academy, and went on to college at Cornell University, where he studied mechanical engineering. He returned to Minnesota to complete his education, earning a degree in finance. He later worked as an investment counselor.

O'Brien was elected to the Minnesota House of Representatives in 1962, and again in 1964. In 1969, he was appointed to the office of Minnesota State Auditor by Gov. Harold LeVander.

O'Brien had four daughters and one stepdaughter; he was married twice. He died in 2007.

References

Republican Party members of the Minnesota House of Representatives
2007 deaths
Cornell University alumni
1930 births
20th-century American politicians